Maria Rosario Rodriguez (born 11 June 1982) is a road cyclist from Spain. She represented her nation at the 2007 UCI Road World Championships.

References

External links
 profile at Procyclingstats.com

1982 births
Spanish female cyclists
Living people
Place of birth missing (living people)